Mezobromelia pleiosticha is a species of flowering plant in the family Bromeliaceae. This species is native to northwestern South America.

References

pleiosticha
Flora of Bolivia
Flora of Colombia
Flora of Costa Rica
Flora of North Brazil
Flora of Ecuador
Flora of French Guiana
Flora of Guyana
Flora of Panama
Flora of Peru
Flora of Suriname
Flora of Trinidad and Tobago
Flora of Venezuela